Grez-Doiceau is a municipality of Wallonia located in the Belgian province of Walloon Brabant. On January 1, 2006, Grez-Doiceau had a total population of 12,403. The total area is 55.44 km² which gives a population density of 224 inhabitants per km². Grez-Doiceau is watered by the Train, a tributary of the Dyle.

The municipality consists of the following districts: Archennes, Biez, Bossut-Gottechain, Grez-Doiceau, and Nethen.

The Nobel Prize-winning cytologist and biochemist Christian de Duve (1917–2013) died in Grez-Doiceau.

References

External links
 

 
Municipalities of Walloon Brabant